Palazzo Madama in Rome is the seat of the Senate of the Italian Republic, the upper house of the Italian Parliament.

History
It was built atop the ruins of the ancient baths of Nero, next to Piazza Navona. The terrain had been acquired in the Middle Ages by the monks of the Abbey of Farfa, who later ceded it to France.

The new building was begun at the end of the 15th century and completed in 1505, for the Medici family. It housed two Medici cardinals and cousins, Giovanni and Giulio, who both later became popes as Leo X and Clement VII, respectively. Catherine de' Medici, Clement VII's niece, also lived here before she was married to Henry, son of King Francis I of France in 1533.  Cardinal Francesco Maria Del Monte, patron of the artist Caravaggio, lived there until his death in 1627.

The palace takes its name from Madama Margherita of Austria, illegitimate daughter of Emperor Charles V, who married another illegitimate son, Alessandro de' Medici and, after his death, Ottavio Farnese. Thus part of the art collection of the Florentine Medici family was inherited by the Farnese family.

The current façade was built in the mid-1650s by both Cigoli and Paolo Maruccelli. The latter added the ornate cornice and whimsical decorative urns on the roof.

After the extinction of the Medici in 1743, the palace was handed over to the House of Lorraine and, later, to Pope Benedict XIV, who made it the seat of the Papal Government. In 1849, Pius IX moved here the Ministries of Finances and of the Public Debt, as well as the Papal Post Offices. In 1871, after the conquest of Rome by the newly formed Kingdom of Italy, the palazzo became the seat of the Senate of the Kingdom of Italy.

See also
Some other Italian institutional buildings:
Palazzo del Quirinale Seat of the President
Palazzo Chigi Seat of the Prime Minister
Palazzo Montecitorio Seat of the Italian Chamber of Deputies
Palazzo della Consulta, seat of the Constitutional Court of Italy

References

External links
 

Houses completed in 1505
Madama
Legislative buildings in Italy
Seats of national legislatures
Rome R. VIII Sant'Eustachio
1505 establishments in the Papal States
Medici residences